Bittenfeld is an incorporated (1975) town located in the northernmost quarter of Waiblingen in the Rems-Murr-Kreis in Baden-Württemberg. Its population is approximately 4,300 inhabitants.

References

 

Towns in Baden-Württemberg